Monnot can refer to :
Monnot Street in Beirut, Lebanon.
Marguerite Monnot (1903 - 1961) was a French songwriter and composer.
Pierre-Étienne Monnot (1657 - 1733) was a French sculptor.
Maurice Louis Monnot (1869 - 1937) was a French painter.